Svetlinsky District is an administrative and municipal district (raion), one of the thirty-five in Orenburg Oblast, Russia. It is located in the east of the oblast. Its administrative center is the rural locality (a settlement) of Svetly. Population: 13,876 (2010 Census);  The population of Svetly accounts for 57.6% of the total district's population.

Geography
Shalkar-Yega-Kara, the largest lake in Orenburg Oblast, is located in the district.

References

Notes

Sources

Districts of Orenburg Oblast